Kumayri FC, is a defunct Armenian football club from Gyumri, Shirak Province.

The club was dissolved in 1997 and is currently inactive from professional football.

League record

References

Defunct football clubs in Armenia
1997 disestablishments in Armenia